Kamenec u Poličky is a municipality and village in Svitavy District in the Pardubice Region of the Czech Republic. It has about 600 inhabitants.

Administrative parts
The village of Jelínek is an administrative part of Kamenec u Poličky.

References

Villages in Svitavy District